Woodberry is a neighborhood located in the north-central area of Baltimore, Maryland, USA. A largely residential, middle-class area, Woodberry is a historic community bordered on the north by Cold Spring Lane, on the south by Druid Hill Park, on the west by Greenspring Avenue, and on the east by the Jones Falls Expressway and the Jones Falls. Woodberry is located within Postal Zip code 21211.

Community organizations include the Concerned Citizens of Woodberry.

Greenspring Trails is a locally popular trail.

Television Hill 

Woodberry also houses the facilities for four of Baltimore's commercial television stations, and because of its altitude, it also is the site of two large broadcasting masts. This area, once known as Malden Hill, is also known as Television Hill (or simply TV Hill). The first television station and transmission tower were completed in 1948.

TV Hill is the transmitting site for four of the city's television stations and two radio stations.

A third, shorter tower also handles communications for various municipal service agencies of the City of Baltimore (e.g., police, fire, public works).

Five television stations also have their broadcasting studios located on TV Hill: WJZ-TV, located at the end of Malden Avenue and to the west of the towers; the WBAL Building (which is also home to WIYY and WBAL radio), on Hooper Avenue to the northeast; and WBFF/WNUV (and WUTB), which share facilities on West 41st Street, just southeast of the towers. (The WMAR-TV studios are located on York Road, at the Baltimore City/Baltimore County line.)

Housing stock
Some of the first housing situated in what is now Television Hill was built by David Carroll for his textile mill workers.

Though there are the occasional apartment buildings, much of Woodberry's housing stock consists of two- and three-story rowhouses built in the early 20th century.

Demographics
At the 2000 U.S. Census, there were 1,100 people living in the neighborhood. The racial makeup of Woodberry was 72.1 percent White, 22.1 percent African American, 0.9 percent Native American, 1.4 percent Asian, 1.3 percent from other races, and 1.8 percent from two or more races. Hispanic or Latino of any race comprised 1.8 percent of the population. 61.4 percent of occupied housing units were owner-occupied. Twelve percent of housing units were vacant.

More than 95% of those in the civilian labor force were employed, 2.5 percent were unemployed, and 39.2 percent were not in the labor force. The median household income was $36,806.

Companies
Franklin Balmar

Public transit
Woodberry is served by the Woodberry Light Rail Station on Union Avenue. Bus lines 21 and 22 also serve the neighborhood.

See also
List of Baltimore neighborhoods

References

External links

Live in Baltimore - Woodberry
Map of Television Hill
, including photo from 2003 and boundary map, at Maryland Historical Trust
Woodberry listing at CHAP includes maps

 
American middle class
Woodberry
Historic districts on the National Register of Historic Places in Baltimore
Gothic Revival architecture in Maryland
Italianate architecture in Maryland